Zellnor Myrie (born 1986) is an American politician. A member of the Democratic Party, he has served in the New York State Senate since 2019, representing the 20th state senate district, which includes parts of Brooklyn.

Early life and education
Myrie was born in Brooklyn, New York City to Costa Rican-born immigrant parents and raised in the Prospect Lefferts Gardens neighborhood. He graduated from Brooklyn Technical High School and attended Fordham University, earning his undergraduate and Master's degrees in urban studies. After graduate school, he earned his Juris Doctor from Cornell Law School where he served as student government president, prison law instructor, and pro bono scholar.

Early career
Before law school, Myrie worked for the New York City Council as a legislative director where he helped draft the Tenant Bill of Rights. After law school, he joined Davis Polk & Wardwell where he worked pro bono to fight police brutality, help special education students get services owed them by the Department of Education, aid victims of domestic violence, and assist asylum seekers.

Political career

In the 2018 elections, Myrie ran for New York State Senate in the 20th district. He challenged Jesse Hamilton, a former member of the Independent Democratic Conference, in the Democratic Party primary election. Myrie defeated Hamilton in the September primary, earning 54% of the vote. Hamilton remained on the ballot in the November general election under the Independence and Women's Equality ballot lines, where Myrie defeated him again, earning over 92% of the vote.

Myrie is chairperson of the Elections Committee in the state senate. He is also a member of the Senate's consumer protection committee. Myrie supported the Housing Stability and Tenant Protection Act of 2019. He also sponsored legislation to ban most evictions during New York's COVID-19 state of emergency.

On May 30, 2020, Myrie was pepper-sprayed and handcuffed while taking part in protests following the murder of George Floyd. On October 29, 2021, six New York City firefighters were suspended for threatening the staff of Myrie in regards to his support of firing certain city employees who were unwilling to be vaccinated against COVID-19.

Myrie supports financial institutions having the right to deny lending capital to ammunition and gun industries. Myrie has advocated for requiring food regulators to target corporations that advertise unhealthy foods. In 2021, Myrie was one of two members of the New York State Senate to vote against a bill designating baseball as the official state sport of New York.

In 2021, Myrie authored the Community Violence Intervention Act, which declared gun violence a public health crisis and which provides millions of dollars to local hospital- and community-based violence intervention programs. Myrie also authored a first-in-the-nation law that classifies illegal gun sales as a nuisance, which could open gun manufacturers to liability.

References

External links

1986 births
Living people
American politicians of Costa Rican descent
Hispanic and Latino American state legislators in New York (state)
Politicians from Brooklyn
American people of Costa Rican descent
Fordham University School of Law alumni
Cornell Law School alumni
Democratic Party New York (state) state senators
21st-century American politicians